Bo Thong may refer to several places in Thailand:

Bo Thong District in Chonburi Province
Bo Thong, Bang Rakam
Bo Thong, Uttaradit